Clay Pinney is an American special effects artist who has won an Academy Award for visual effects as well as an Academy Award for Technical Achievement.

Oscar History

Both are in the category of Best Visual Effects.

64th Academy Awards-Nominated for Backdraft. Nomination shared with Scott Farrar, Allen Hall and Mikael Salomon. Lost to Terminator 2: Judgment Day.
69th Academy Awards-Independence Day. Shared with Volker Engel, Douglas Smith and Joe Viskocil. Won.

In addition, he received the Academy Award for Technical Achievement during the 86th Academy Awards.

Selected filmography

RoboCop (2014)
Man of Steel (2013)
Pacific Rim (2013)
Star Trek (2009)
Rush Hour 3 (2007)
The Matrix Reloaded (2003)
Peter Pan (2003)
Godzilla (1998)
Volcano (1997)
Independence Day (1996)
Backdraft (1991)
Who Framed Roger Rabbit (1988)
Star Trek IV: The Voyage Home (1986)
The Man with Two Brains (1983)

References

External links

Living people
Best Visual Effects Academy Award winners
Special effects people
Academy Award for Technical Achievement winners
Year of birth missing (living people)